Reederite-(Y) is a rare mineral with the formula . It is the only known mineral with fluorosulfate (fluorosulfonate). "REE" in the formula stands for rare earth elements other than yttrium, that is mostly cerium, with traces of neodymium, dysprosium, lanthanum and erbium. The formula also includes a Levinson suffix "-(Y)" pointing to the dominance of yttrium at the corresponding site. Reederite-(Y) crystallizes in the hexagonal crystal system with the space group P, rarely seen among minerals.

References

Carbonate minerals
Sodium minerals
Yttrium minerals
Hexagonal minerals
Minerals in space group 174